Zhang Lei (born 23 March 1979 in Nanjing, Jiangsu) is a female Chinese foil fencer. She competed at the 2000 and 2008 Summer Olympics.

Major performances
2002 Asian Games – 1st foil;
2008 World Cup Germany – 1st foil

See also
China at the 2000 Summer Olympics
China at the 2008 Summer Olympics

References

1979 births
Living people
Chinese female fencers
Fencers at the 2000 Summer Olympics
Fencers at the 2008 Summer Olympics
Olympic fencers of China
Sportspeople from Nanjing
Asian Games medalists in fencing
Fencers at the 2002 Asian Games
Asian Games gold medalists for China
Asian Games silver medalists for China
Medalists at the 2002 Asian Games
Universiade medalists in fencing
Fencers from Jiangsu
Universiade bronze medalists for China
Medalists at the 2001 Summer Universiade
21st-century Chinese women